The 2022 Indonesia Open (officially known as the East Ventures Indonesia Open 2022 for sponsorship reasons) was a badminton tournament which took place at the Istora Gelora Bung Karno in Jakarta, Indonesia, from 14 to 19 June 2022. It had a total prize of US$1,200,000.

The host country Indonesia failed to send any representatives in the tournament's semi-finals for the first time ever.

Tournament
The 2022 Indonesia Open was one of the tournaments in 2022 BWF World Tour. It was a part of the Indonesia Open which had been held since 1982 and was organized by the Badminton Association of Indonesia with sanction from BWF.

Venue
This international tournament was held at the Istora Gelora Bung Karno inside the Gelora Bung Karno Sports Complex in Central Jakarta, Jakarta, Indonesia.

Point distribution 
Below is the point distribution table for each phase of the tournament based on the BWF points system for the BWF World Tour Super 1000 event.

Prize money 
The total prize money for this tournament was US$1,200,000. The distribution of the prize money was in accordance with BWF regulations.

Men's singles

Seeds 

 Viktor Axelsen (champion)
 Kento Momota (first round)
 Anders Antonsen (withdrew)
 Chou Tien-chen (second round)
 Anthony Sinisuka Ginting (quarter-finals)
 Lee Zii Jia (semi-finals)
 Jonatan Christie (second round)
 Lakshya Sen (first round)

Finals

Top half

Section 1

Section 2

Bottom half

Section 3

Section 4

Women's singles

Seeds 

 Akane Yamaguchi (quarter-finals)
 Tai Tzu-ying (champion)
 An Se-young (quarter-finals)
 Chen Yufei (semi-finals)
 Carolina Marín (second round)
 Nozomi Okuhara (quarter-finals)
 P. V. Sindhu (first round)
 Ratchanok Intanon (second round)

Finals

Top half

Section 1

Section 2

Bottom half

Section 3

Section 4

Men's doubles

Seeds 

 Marcus Fernaldi Gideon / Kevin Sanjaya Sukamuljo (second round)
 Mohammad Ahsan / Hendra Setiawan (first round)
 Takuro Hoki / Yugo Kobayashi (quarter-finals)
 Lee Yang / Wang Chi-lin (second round)
 Aaron Chia / Soh Wooi Yik (semi-finals)
 Fajar Alfian / Muhammad Rian Ardianto (quarter-finals)
 Satwiksairaj Rankireddy / Chirag Shetty (withdrew)
 Kim Astrup / Anders Skaarup Rasmussen (semi-finals)

Finals

Top half

Section 1

Section 2

Bottom half

Section 3

Section 4

Women's doubles

Seeds 

 Chen Qingchen / Jia Yifan (quarter-finals)
 Lee So-hee / Shin Seung-chan (semi-finals)
 Kim So-yeong / Kong Hee-yong (withdrew)
 Yuki Fukushima / Sayaka Hirota (final)
 Mayu Matsumoto / Wakana Nagahara (first round)
 Nami Matsuyama / Chiharu Shida (champions)
 Jongkolphan Kititharakul / Rawinda Prajongjai (semi-finals)
 Gabriela Stoeva / Stefani Stoeva (second round)

Finals

Top half

Section 1

Section 2

Bottom half

Section 3

Section 4

Mixed doubles

Seeds 

 Dechapol Puavaranukroh / Sapsiree Taerattanachai (first round)
 Zheng Siwei / Huang Yaqiong (champions)
 Yuta Watanabe / Arisa Higashino (final)
 Wang Yilyu / Huang Dongping (semi-finals)
 Praveen Jordan / Melati Daeva Oktavianti (second round)
 Seo Seung-jae / Chae Yoo-jung (semi-finals)
 Tang Chun Man / Tse Ying Suet (withdrew)
 Tan Kian Meng / Lai Pei Jing (first round)

Finals

Top half

Section 1

Section 2

Bottom half

Section 3

Section 4

References

External links
 Tournament Link

Indonesia Open (badminton)
Indonesia Open
Indonesia Open
Indonesia Open